Billy Etbauer (born January 15, 1963) is an American former professional rodeo cowboy who specialized in saddle bronc riding. He competed on the Professional Rodeo Cowboys Association (PRCA) circuit along with his two brothers, Robert and Dan. He won the PRCA saddle bronc riding world championship five times.

Background 
Etbauer was born in Huron, South Dakota, on January 15, 1963, and now lives in Edmond, Oklahoma. He is the middle son of three boys who were all first class saddle bronc riders. He traveled, shared resources, and competed with his brothers Robert, Dan, and friend, Craig Latham. Latham was often referred to as "the fourth Etbauer". His brother Robert won the PRCA saddle bronc riding world championship in 1990 and 1991.

He married his wife Hollie on April 2, 1994, and had three children, homeschooled by Hollie. He and his wife raise quarter horses in Oklahoma.

Career 
In 1989, in his second year as a professional on the PRCA, he qualified for the National Finals Rodeo (NFR). He qualified for the NFR 21 consecutive years, winning 51 rounds – a record for that forum.

He is known for winning the 10th round of the NFR at least 9 times. In 2005, he was a guest on the Late Show with David Letterman and spoke about the NFR. In 1992 he won $101,531 in 10 days at the finals. As of 2007 he had $2.7 million in PRCA earnings alone.

He won the World Saddle Bronc Riding Championship five times. He earned more than $1 million in his second championship season. He made a 93-point ride on Kesler Championship Rodeo's Cool Alley in 2003, which was an NFR record at the time. He tied his own record on the same horse a year later. That record-tying ride brought him the last of his five championship buckles (1992, 1996, 1999, 2000, 2004), a record surpassed only by Casey Tibbs and Dan Mortensen. He was 41 years old at the time, making him the "oldest roughstock world champion". Cool Alley was named the PRCA 2001 Bareback Bronc of the Year and the 2004 Saddle Bronc of the Year.

Like Trevor Brazile, Etbauer has transcended the $3 million mark in earnings. He was the first to reach that mark in one event. He finished his career with $3,015,377 in final earnings.

As a team, the three brothers and their friend are responsible for 52 NFR qualifications. This includes ten for Dan and nine for Latham. The Etbauers "dominated" the 1990s: they are the only trio of brothers "to qualify for the NFR in the same roughstock event in the same year – and they did it eight times". All three brothers were inducted into the Rodeo Hall of Fame. The ProRodeo Hall of Fame in Colorado Springs, Colorado, inducted Etbauer in 2012. His brother Robert is also a ProRodeo Hall of Fame inductee.

Honors 

 2020 Cheyenne Frontier Days Hall of Fame
 2015 South Dakota Sports Hall of Fame
 2013 Rodeo Hall of Fame of the National Cowboy and Western Heritage Museum
 2012 ProRodeo Hall of Fame

References

Bibliography

External links
 PRCA Online - ProRodeo Cowboy Biographies - Billy Etbauer

Videos
 Billy Etbauer vs Cool Alley - 04 National Finals Rodeo, Round 10 (93 points)
 Billy & Robert Etbauer - 2012 ProRodeo Hall of Fame Inductees Official PRCA Video

1963 births
Living people
People from Huron, South Dakota
Sportspeople from Edmond, Oklahoma
ProRodeo Hall of Fame inductees
Saddle bronc riders